Louis Charles de Lévis (1647 – 18 September 1717) was a French nobleman and Duke of Ventadour. His wife was the governess of the infant Louis XV and his only child Anne Geneviève made two prestigious marriages into contemporary nobility.

Biography

The eldest of three children, his younger sister Marguerite Félice de Lévis (1648–1717) married Jacques Henri de Durfort de Duras and was the sister in law of the Maréchal de Lorges.

On his father's side, he was a relative of the wealthy Montmorency family. He married Charlotte de La Motte Houdancourt in Paris on 14 March 1671. She was the daughter of Philippe de La Mothe-Houdancourt and Louise de Prie.

The Duke was generally considered "horrific" — very ugly, physically deformed, and sexually debauched — yet the privileges of being a duchess compensated for the unfortunate match, e.g. le tabouret: In a letter to her daughter, Madame de Sévigné described an incident that took place at St. Germain during an audience with the Queen.

"… a lot of duchesses came in, including the beautiful and charming Duchess of Ventadour. There was a bit of a delay before they brought her the sacred stool. I turned to the Grand Master and I said, 'Oh, just give it to her. It certainly cost her enough,' and he agreed."

He and his wife had a daughter. Louis Charles died in 1717 during the Regency of Philippe d'Orléans.

His wife was a lady in waiting to Duchess of Orléans and guardian of the infant Louis XV.

Issue

Anne Geneviève de Lévis, "Mademoiselle de Ventadour", Princess of Turenne, Duchess of Rohan-Rohan, Princess of Maubuisson, Princess of Soubise (February 1673 – 20 March 1727)

Married Louis Charles de La Tour d'Auvergne, Prince of Turenne in 1692 (son of Godefroy Maurice de La Tour d'Auvergne and Marie Anne Mancini) had no issue;
Married Hercule Mériadec de Rohan, Duke of Rohan-Rohan in 1694, son of François de Rohan and Anne de Rohan-Chabot, had issue.

Ancestry

References and notes

French Roman Catholics
1647 births
1717 deaths
Louis Charles
17th-century peers of France
18th-century peers of France
Dukes of Ventadour
House of Montmorency